Lake Murray is the largest lake in Papua New Guinea. It has a highly convoluted shoreline more than 2000 km long.
The lake has been a source of nourishment for many of the local peoples. Freshwater sawfish have been caught in its shallow waters to feed the crocodiles in a farming operation.

Indigenous tribes of around 5000 people own the lake and the surrounding one million hectares of forest.

Lake Murray is known for a large population of peacock bass that were introduced by Indian merchants.

Illegal logging
In 2003, logging company Concord Pacific was forced out of the area by Greenpeace and other NGO's. 100,000 hectares of ancient forest was degraded by the logging along the Kiunga-Aiambak road.

Greenpeace Global Forest Rescue Station (GFRS)
Lake Murray was the site of a Greenpeace Australia Pacific Global Forest Rescue Station. Forty volunteers from 25 countries worked with the local Kuni, Begwa and Pari tribes to identify and mark land ownership. The boundary marking was the precursor to a community based eco-forestry project. Ecotimber has since been harvested, shipped to Australia and sold with the benefit of Forestry Stewardship Council certification.

See also 
Lake Murray languages

References 

Murray
Western Province (Papua New Guinea)